Jiangtai is a station on Line 14 of the Beijing Subway. The station opened on 28 December 2014.

Location
It is located in Chaoyang District, outside and northeast of the 4th Ring Road, near the junction of Jiangtai Road and Jiuxianqiao Road.

Station layout 
The station has 2 underground side platforms.

Exits
There are three exits, lettered A, B, and C. Exit B is accessible. INDIGO, Beijing is accessible from exit C.

References

Beijing Subway stations in Chaoyang District
Railway stations in China opened in 2014